Season four of Quantum Leap ran on NBC from September 18, 1991 to May 20, 1992. The series follows the exploits of Dr. Sam Beckett and his Project Quantum Leap (PQL), through which he involuntarily leaps through spacetime, temporarily taking over a host in order to correct historical mistakes.  Season four consists of 22 episodes.

For his work this season, Scott Bakula won the Golden Globe for Best Actor – Television Series Drama.

Episodes

References

Quantum Leap seasons
1991 American television seasons
1992 American television seasons